Bellatrix Lestrange is a fictional character in the Harry Potter book series written by J. K. Rowling. She evolved from an unnamed periphery character in Harry Potter and the Goblet of Fire into a major antagonist in subsequent novels. In the final installment of the story, Rowling established her as Lord Voldemort's "last, best lieutenant". Bellatrix was the first female Death Eater introduced in the books, and remained the only woman explicitly identified as such. Bellatrix had a ravaging obsession with the Dark Lord despite the fact that she was clearly fearful of his magical abilities and absolute power over his forces. 

She is portrayed by Helena Bonham Carter in four Harry Potter films, from Order of the Phoenix (2007) to Deathly Hallows – Part 2 (2011).

Name

Her given name derives from Latin as the feminine form of the noun "warrior". Like many members of the Black family, Bellatrix is named after a celestial body or astronomic structure, in this case one of the brightest stars in the constellation Orion.

Bellatrix's name has been translated into other languages in a variety of ways. Many of the changes accentuate the evil nature of her character, such as the Dutch "Bellatrix van Detta".

Character background
Bellatrix Black was born to Cygnus and Druella (Rosier) Black in 1951. 

Bellatrix is related by blood and marriage to many characters in the novels (although in the fifth book it is specified that all pure-blood families are related to each other): she has two younger sisters, Narcissa and Andromeda, and is first cousin to Sirius. She married Rodolphus Lestrange after leaving Hogwarts "because it was expected of her" to marry a pure-blood. However, Rowling stated in an interview that Bellatrix truly loved Voldemort. Andromeda married a Muggle-born, Ted Tonks, and was subsequently disowned by the Blacks, whereas Narcissa, conversely, married Lucius Malfoy, heir of a wealthy pure-blood family; thus, Bellatrix is the aunt of both Nymphadora Tonks and Draco Malfoy, respectively. 

At Hogwarts, she, along with her sisters, was sorted into Slytherin. It is suggested in the novels that, as a student, Bellatrix associated with a group of students – including Rodolphus Lestrange, Severus Snape, Avery, Evan Rosier and Wilkes – who nearly all became Death Eaters. It is assumed Bellatrix was at least initially drawn to Lord Voldemort because they both believe in an ideology that favors pure-blood wizards and witches over other members of the community. This elitism, shared by the Malfoy and Lestrange clans, was instilled in Bellatrix since childhood. The Black family motto, toujours pur (French for "always pure"), reflects this steadfast belief in blood purity. Bellatrix, her husband, and her brother-in-law, were active Death Eaters during Voldemort's rise to power, and evaded capture and suspicion until after the Dark Lord's downfall.

Appearances

Harry Potter and the Goblet of Fire
In this book, Rowling used Albus Dumbledore's Pensieve as a plot device to reveal that Bellatrix, rather than deserting her leader like many other Death Eaters, was part of the group of dark wizards – along with Rodolphus, Rabastan, and Barty Crouch Jr – that tortured well-known aurors Frank and Alice Longbottom in an attempt to gain information about Voldemort's location. For using the Unforgivable Cruciatus Curse to torture the Longbottoms until they went insane, Bellatrix and her three associates were sentenced to life imprisonment in Azkaban. At her trial, Bellatrix proudly and defiantly proclaimed that Voldemort would rise again. Later in that book, during his rebirthing ritual, Voldemort stated that the Lestranges were amongst the most faithful members of his inner circle.

Harry Potter and the Order of the Phoenix
Fourteen years after Voldemort's fall, Bellatrix was one of the many Death Eaters who escaped Azkaban and rejoined him. After escaping from prison, she was present at the Battle of the Department of Mysteries in the climax of the book, in which a group of Death Eaters attempted to steal Sybill Trelawney's prophecy pertaining to Voldemort's downfall. Rowling let Bellatrix prove her magical prowess during the mission when she overpowered her niece Tonks and Kingsley Shacklebolt in one-on-one duels, killed her cousin Sirius by blasting him through the veil in the Death Chamber, and deflected one of Dumbledore's spells as she made her escape. Harry attempted to use the Cruciatus Curse on her in revenge for killing Sirius, but the curse was ineffective due to the lack of real cruelty behind it. Before she could do any more, Bellatrix was joined by her master, who ignored her warning that Dumbledore was in the building. Bellatrix was subdued by Dumbledore in the Ministry of Magic's Atrium while he duelled Voldemort. Voldemort interceded on Bellatrix's behalf, grabbing her and taking her with him as he Disapparated, though not before being glimpsed by Ministry officials.

Harry Potter and the Half-Blood Prince
At the beginning of Harry Potter and the Half-Blood Prince, Bellatrix attempts to keep Narcissa from confiding Draco's secret mission to Snape at Spinner's End. Rowling used the conversation between Snape and Bellatrix to imply that Voldemort is still furious at Bellatrix's failure in the previous book. That conversation also suggests that Bellatrix mistrusts Snape not only because of his low birth, but also for many valid questions about his loyalty to the Dark Lord. Snape surprises Bellatrix by replying to each of her arguments and by agreeing to create an Unbreakable Vow with Narcissa to assist Draco in his mission to kill Dumbledore. Later in the book, it is mentioned by Snape that Bellatrix had been teaching Occlumency to Draco, in an effort to aid him with his mission. In the film, she and Fenrir Greyback arrive at the Burrow, the Weasleys' home, and burn it down. Ginny Weasley and Harry chase after them, with Bellatrix taunting them over her murder of Sirius.

Harry Potter and the Deathly Hallows
The first chapter of Harry Potter and the Deathly Hallows implies that Voldemort is still angry with Bellatrix, as evidenced when he makes fun of the fact that her niece Tonks married werewolf Remus Lupin. However, Voldemort gives Bellatrix a chance to "prune" her family tree during the Death Eaters' attempt to capture Harry as the boy departs from the Dursleys' home, during which Bellatrix unsuccessfully tries to kill Tonks. In this book, Rowling reveals that Bellatrix is the guardian of Helga Hufflepuff's cup (though she is unaware that it is a Horcrux), which Voldemort has entrusted the Lestranges to keep in their Gringotts vault. Bellatrix and the Malfoys detain Harry, Ron, and Hermione at Malfoy Manor, and Hermione is tortured by Bellatrix when she suspects the trio has broken into her vault, but Dobby appears and saves the prisoners, though not before being hit by a knife thrown by Bellatrix as they disapparate to safety. Later in the book, Harry, Ron, and Hermione use a stray hair of Bellatrix's to disguise Hermione as Bellatrix using Polyjuice Potion, in order to gain access to the Lestrange's Gringotts vault. Though Voldemort apparently punishes Bellatrix and the Malfoys severely for interrupting his Elder Wand side quest only to have Potter escape and steal the cup, she nevertheless fights for her master in the Battle of Hogwarts towards the end of the novel. When the battle resumes inside the Great Hall after Harry's supposed death, Bellatrix simultaneously duels with Hermione, Ginny, and Luna Lovegood, none of whom is a match for Bellatrix, who nearly hits Ginny with a Killing Curse. An enraged Molly Weasley engages Bellatrix in a duel and fires a curse that hits Bellatrix right over the heart, killing her. Rowling revealed that, though there was speculation that Neville would kill Bellatrix, she had always intended Molly to do so because the author wanted to match Bellatrix's obsessive love with Molly's maternal love.

Appearances in other media

Harry Potter and the Cursed Child

In this play, which takes place over 19 years after The Deathly Hallows, it is revealed that Bellatrix is the mother of the story's antagonist Delphini, whom she had with Lord Voldemort during their stay at Malfoy Manor prior to the Battle of Hogwarts.

Production

Actress Helen McCrory was originally cast as Bellatrix in Harry Potter and the Order of the Phoenix but dropped out due to pregnancy and was replaced with Helena Bonham Carter. Coincidentally, McCrory was later cast as Bellatrix's sister Narcissa in Harry Potter and the Half-Blood Prince, during the filming of which Bonham Carter learned that she was pregnant. McCrory was also cast as Narcissa after Naomi Watts was unavailable for the role. Elizabeth Hurley was also reportedly linked to the role of Bellatrix at one point. While filming the scene in the Department of Mysteries in Order of the Phoenix, Bonham Carter accidentally ruptured the eardrum of Matthew Lewis, the actor who portrayed Neville Longbottom, with her wand.

Family

Bellatrix is a member of the Black Family and is the cousin of Sirius Black. Bellatrix is the daughter of Cygnus and Druella Black and sister to Andromeda (mother of Nymphadora Tonks) and Narcissa (mother of Draco Malfoy).

Reception
IGN listed Bellatrix Lestrange as their tenth top Harry Potter character, and IGN's Joe Utichi listed Bellatrix as his fourth favourite Harry Potter character, calling her the "most pitiable" of Voldemort's servants. In NextMovie.com's Harry Potter Mega Poll, Bellatrix was voted as the No. 1 villain in the series. Helena Bonham Carter received much praise for her portrayal of the character. Famed author Stephen King was a fan of the character, and claimed that reading Molly Weasley calling the character "a bitch" in Harry Potter and the Deathly Hallows was "the most shocking bitch in recent fiction" and showed how mature the books had become.

References

External links 
 

Harry Potter characters
Literary characters introduced in 2003
Female film villains
Female literary villains
Fictional British people
Fictional witches
Fictional torturers
Fictional murderers
Fictional female assassins
Fictional prison escapees
Fictional terrorists
Fictional henchmen
Fictional war veterans
Film characters introduced in 2007